Stella Splendens ("Splendid Star") is a polyphonic song (fol. 21v–22), with two parts voices from the Llibre Vermell de Montserrat, one of the oldest extant medieval manuscripts containing music. In modern times it has been recorded by many artists:

 Jordi Savall, Hespèrion XX (album Llibre Vermell de Montserrat - siglo XIV, 1978)
 Estampie (album Ave maris stella, 1991)
 The New London Consort, directed by Philip Pickett (album Llibre vermell, pilgrim songs & dances, 1992)
 Capilla Musical y Escolanía de la Santa Cruz del Valle de los Caídos & Atrium Musicae, directed by Luis Lozano & Gregorio Paniagua (album Canto antiguo español, 1994)
 Companyia Elèctrica Dharma & Grallers De L'Acord (album 20 Anys Electrica Dharma, 1994)
 Schola Gregoriana Mediolanensis, directed by Giovanni Vianini (album Ad cantica, 1994)
 Corvus Corax (album Tritonus, 1995)
 Ensemble Micrologus: "Stella splendens (ballata)" (album in festa, 1995)
 Adaro (album Stella splendens, 1997)
 Novalia (album Canti e briganti, 1997)
 In Extremo (album Weckt Die Toten!, 1998)
 Studio der Frühen Musik directed by Thomas Binkley (album Secular music c1300, 1998)
 Corona Borealis (album Cantus Paganus, 2000)
 Psalteria (album Scalerica d'oro, 2001)
 Hughes de Courson (album Lux Obscura: Un Projet Electro-Medieval, 2003)
 Saltatio Mortis (album Heptessenz – Marktmusik des Mittelalters, 2003)
 Vox Vulgaris (album The Shape of Medieval Music to Come, 2003)
 Barco Brena (album The celts on the organ, 2004)
 Cornix Maledictum (album Mariage en noir, 2004)
 Qntal (album Illuminate, 2004)
 Heimatærde (maxi-single Hick hack hackebeil, 2016)
 Welladay (album Dedication, 2004)
 Arcana Obscura (album Aderlass vol.5, 2007)
 Richard Searles (album "Jongleurs Dance")
 Choeur de Chambre de Namur (album Llibre Vermell, 2007)
 Blackmore's Night: "Locked Within the Crystal Ball" (album Secret Voyage, 2008)
 Daniele Sepe (album Kronomakia, 2008)
 Luc Arbogast (album Aux portes de Sananda, 2009)
 Jose Luis Pastor (album The Evidence, 2015)
 Apocalypse Orchestra: "Flagellants' Song" (album The End Is Nigh, 2017)

References

Medieval compositions

fr:Livre vermeil de Montserrat#Stella splendens